Champion Records, based in the UK, is an independent record label founded by Mel Medalie in 1980, with an emphasis on soul and dance. Champion Records is based in London, and claims to be one of the oldest record companies with the same management/ownership. DJ Paul Oakenfold is one of its former A&R men.

References

External links
Champion Records UK

British record labels
House music record labels
English electronic dance music record labels
Record labels established in 1980